Runet is the Russian-language community on the internet.

Runet may also refer to:

Internet in Russian language
Internet in Russia
.ru, the Russian top level domain